Centuria, also known as Centuriensis, was a Roman era town in Numidia, Roman province of Africa. It has been tentatively identified with ruins near Ain El Hadjar in Algeria, south of Saida.

Bishopric
The city was the seat of an ancient bishopric and the current bishop is Ferenc Cserháti. Known bishops of the town include:
 Quodvultdeus (fl. 402–411) (Catholic bishop attended the Council of Milevum (402) and Council of Carthage (411)
Cresconio fl. 411) (rival Donatist) 
 Gennaro fl.484 
Luis Camargo Pacheco (1622–1665)
Johann Kaspar Kühner (1664–1685) 
Andrew Giffard (1705 Appointed - Did not take office) 
John Douglass (10 Sep 1790 appointed – 8 May 1812 died)
Myles Prendergast (1818–1844) 
Antonio Majthényi (1840–1856) 
St. Valentín Faustino Berrio Ochoa, (1857 – 1 Nov 1861) 
Thomas McNulty (1864–1866) 
Bonifacio Antonio Toscano (1874–1896) 
Giuseppe Perrachon (18 Dec 1925 – 1944) 
Stanislao Czajka (1944–1965) 
William Joseph Moran (1965–1996) 
Piotr Libera (1996–2007) 
Ferenc Cserháti (15 Jun 2007 appointed – )

References

Archaeological sites in Algeria
Roman towns and cities in Algeria
Ancient Berber cities
Catholic titular sees in Africa